Charaxes thomasius is a butterfly in the family Nymphalidae. It is found on the island of São Tomé.

Description
The basal area of the upperside forewing and a smaller basal area of the hindwing is light yellow. The rest is dark chestnut brown with small and faint submarginal and marginal stains.

Taxonomy
The species is sometimes treated as a subspecies of Charaxes candiope. It is considered part of the Charaxes candiope group.

Realm
Afrotropical realm.

References

External links
Charaxes thomasius images at Consortium for the Barcode of Life

Butterflies described in 1886
thomasius
Invertebrates of São Tomé and Príncipe
Endemic fauna of São Tomé Island
Butterflies of Africa
Taxa named by Otto Staudinger